Cole John Riel (born July 21, 1995) is an American politician who was elected in 2018 to the New Hampshire House of Representatives. In 2019, he was hired as 2020 presidential candidate Pete Buttigieg's state outreach coordinator. He decided against seeking reelection in 2020.

References

External links

Living people
1995 births
Democratic Party members of the New Hampshire House of Representatives
People from Goffstown, New Hampshire
University of New Hampshire alumni
21st-century American politicians